The Domont Station is a railway station in Domont in the Val d'Oise department, France. It is on the Épinay-Villetaneuse–Le Tréport-Mers railway. The station is used by Transilien line H trains from Paris to Persan-Beaumont and Luzarches. The number of daily passengers was between 2,500 and 7,500 in 2002. The station has 509 free parking spaces.

History
The Nord Company opened the line from Épinay to Persan-Beaumont via Montsoult in 1877.

References

External links

 

Railway stations in Val-d'Oise
Railway stations in France opened in 1877